Jøden may refer to:

Jøden, a Jewish ethnonym in Danish language
Jøden (rapper) (born 1974), a Danish rapper